Ramona Gail Phillips (née McIver; May 15, 1944 – March 25, 2021) was the 17th Speaker of the Alaska House of Representatives.

Early life and career
Born in Juneau, Alaska, Phillips graduated from Nome High School, in Nome, Alaska, in 1962. She then received her bachelor's degree in business education from University of Alaska Fairbanks. Phillips was involved in the mining industry. She also owned Quiet Sports Store and managed Wein Air Alaska, Phillips taught business education in Nome, Alaska from 1967 to 1969.

Political career
Phillips served on the Homer, Alaska City Council from 1981 to 1984. From 1984 to 1986, Phillips served on the Kenai Peninsula Borough Assembly and was involved with the Republican Party.

Phillips served in the Alaska House of Representatives from 1991 to 2001 and was speaker of the house from 1995 to 1999.

In 2002, Phillips ran for the election for Lieutenant Governor of Alaska and lost the election.

Death
Phillips died on March 25, 2021, after a long battle with cancer.

See also
List of female speakers of legislatures in the United States

Notes

1944 births
2021 deaths
Politicians from Juneau, Alaska
University of Alaska Fairbanks alumni
Businesspeople from Alaska
Educators from Alaska
Women state legislators in Alaska
Republican Party members of the Alaska House of Representatives
Alaska city council members
Borough assembly members in Alaska
Speakers of the Alaska House of Representatives
Women city councillors in Alaska
20th-century American businesspeople
20th-century American businesswomen
20th-century American politicians
20th-century American women politicians
21st-century American politicians
21st-century American women politicians
20th-century American educators
20th-century American women educators
Candidates in the 2002 United States elections